Eurymesosa is a genus of longhorn beetles of the subfamily Lamiinae, containing the following species:

 Eurymesosa affinis Breuning, 1970
 Eurymesosa albostictica Breuning, 1962
 Eurymesosa multinigromaculata Breuning, 1974
 Eurymesosa ventralis (Pascoe, 1865)
 Eurymesosa ziranzhiyi (Meiying Lin, 2016)

Type species: Ereis ventralis Pascoe, 1865, by original designation

References

Mesosini